The 2018 DFL-Supercup was the ninth edition of the German super cup under the name DFL-Supercup, an annual football match contested by the winners of the previous season's Bundesliga and DFB-Pokal competitions. The match was played on 12 August 2018.

The DFL-Supercup featured Eintracht Frankfurt, the winners of the 2017–18 DFB-Pokal, and Bayern Munich, the winners of the 2017–18 Bundesliga and two-time defending champions of the DFL-Supercup.

Bayern Munich won the match 5–0 for their third consecutive and seventh overall title.

Teams
In the following table, matches until 1996 were in the DFB-Supercup era, since 2010 were in the DFL-Supercup era.

Background
This was the first competitive match for incoming Bayern manager Niko Kovač, who left Eintracht Frankfurt the previous season after leading them to the DFB-Pokal title over future employers Bayern Munich.

Match

Details

Statistics

See also
2017–18 Bundesliga
2017–18 DFB-Pokal

References

External links

2018
2018–19 in German football cups
Eintracht Frankfurt matches
FC Bayern Munich matches
Football in Frankfurt
Dfl-Supercup
Sports competitions in Frankfurt
2010s in Frankfurt